Borys Wrzesnewskyj (born November 10, 1960) is a Canadian politician who represented the riding of Etobicoke Centre in the House of Commons of Canada. He held the riding from 2004 to 2011 and again from 2015 to 2019. He is a member of the Liberal Party.

Background
Wrzesnewskyj was born in Etobicoke, Ontario, Canada (now a part of Toronto). He is a third-generation Ukrainian Canadian, of the Ukrainian Catholic Church, and partly Polish from paternal family. He attended Humber Valley Village Public School and Upper Canada College. He received a Bachelor of Commerce from Trinity College, University of Toronto and has been a member of Plast. He speaks English, Ukrainian, Polish, French, and Spanish. He is the owner of Future Bakery, founded by his grandparents, and M-C Dairy.

Humanitarian work
Wrzesnewskyj is known for his humanitarian work both in his riding of Etobicoke Centre and abroad, including helping children causes in Ukraine. Through Future Bakery, Wrzesnewskyj was one of the original sponsors of the Out of the Cold program to aid the homeless and numerous other charitable organizations working in a number of Toronto's most challenging neighbourhoods.

In the late 1980s he helped organize and finance the nascent Rukh Movement (People's Movement of Ukraine). In 1991, financed and organized a group in support of the referendum for the independence of Ukraine. One of his projects was an underground printing press which produced and distributed several million pieces of pro-independence literature in the South and East of Ukraine. Throughout the 1990s, he was involved with various civil society and humanitarian projects in Ukraine, such as the building of libraries and providing scholarships for gifted students.

Through his family foundation, Wrzesnewskyj has provided funding support for the following:

 The Ukraine Transparency and Election Monitoring Project to train independent election scrutineers in Ukraine.
 The Ukraine List electronic periodical of the Chair of Ukrainian Studies (University of Ottawa) targeting policy specialists and academics.
 The delivery of Ukrainian News to every MP and Senator in Canada's Parliament.
 The publication and delivery of Ukraine Analyst to members of the Canada-Ukraine Parliamentary Friendship Group.
 Ukrainian courses at The Centre for European, Russian, and Eurasian Studies (CERES) at the University of Toronto.
 Grants for archival research into Ukrainian national movements during World War II.
 The republication of books about Ukrainians who perished in the Holocaust.
 Archival research into victims of the Holocaust and Soviet terror in the Sambir region of Ukraine.
 Donated $500,000 to build the Ukrainian Canadian Care Centre (Toronto, Ontario, Canada).
 Annually sponsored an intern from Ukraine to participate in an internship program in Canada's Parliament (Canada-Ukraine Parliamentary Program).
 Donated $250,000 to finance election observers for the first round of voting in Ukraine.
 Self-funded missions to Sudan, Darfur, Somalia, the West Bank, and East Jerusalem.
 Lead the Ukrainian Canadian community's fundraising effort for famine relief in Somalia during the 2011 Horn of Africa famine, with $100,000 committed.
 Donated $100,000 to the Ukrainian Catholic University in Lviv, Ukraine.
 In 2014 he sponsored the publication of "This Blessed Land: Crimea and the Crimean Tatars" by Paul Robert Magocsi

In December 2010, he created the Roman Wrzesnewskyj Polish Endowment Fund with a $35,000 donation toward the preservation and development of advanced Polish language studies at the Department of Slavic Languages and Literatures, University of Toronto. Additionally, each Christmas and New Year's Day, he donates his time by delivering toys and gifts to children in community housing projects in Etobicoke Centre.

Politics
Wrzesnewskyj was actively involved in the Canadian delegation to the contested Ukrainian election of 2004, Orange Revolution, and has often spoken to Canadian media on its behalf. Then, Canadian Prime Minister, Paul Martin said that he was personally briefed by him to publicly warn Russian President Vladimir Putin "hands off the Ukrainian election" in the House of Commons of Canada which fundamentally shifted Canada's position (Wrzesnewskyj telephoned Martin from Kyiv during the Orange Revolution). Originally, the Department of Foreign Affairs and International Trade in Ottawa took a "hands off" approach to the contested Ukrainian election. Martin says that he, and the Government of Canada would not have stood up for democracy in Ukraine "if it hadn't been for Borys". Subsequently, he was instrumental in securing the Government of Canada's commitment to sending five hundred Canadian election observers to the December 2004 Presidential elections in Ukraine.

Legislative work

His House of Commons legislative work saw the introduction of several private member's bills and motions including:

 Bill C-180, "An Act to amend the Criminal Code (hate propaganda)", 6 May 2009; Bill C-181, "An Act to amend the Criminal Code (trafficking and transplanting human organs and other body parts)", 7 May 2009.
 Bill C-383, "An Act respecting education benefits for spouses and children of certain deceased federal enforcement officers", 12 May 2009.
 Bill C-394 "An Act to acknowledge that persons of Croatian origin were interned in Canada during the First World War and to provide for recognition of this event", 26 May 2009. This began as his Private Members' Bill C-374, which the Winnipeg Sun placed this item in its top ten list of bills (9 November 2006).
 Bill C-450, "An Act respecting a national day of remembrance of the Ukrainian Holodomor-Genocide".
 Bill C-537, "An Act to amend the Criminal Code (judicial interim release for offenses involving firearms)" to toughen up bail conditions for perpetrators of crimes involving guns, June 2010.

Regarding Bill C-181, Wrzesnewskyj gave a press conference in Ottawa together with David Matas and David Kilgour, authors of "Bloody Harvest: Organ Harvesting of Falun Gong Practitioners in China". While saying that "consumers benefit from trade with China", and that "Canada would like to do more trade with China", he asserted "it does not exonerate us for addressing the issue of Organ transplantation in China" and questioned "trusting a country that would engage in this sort of horrific crime against its own people."

Wrzesnewskyj helped pass MP James Bezan's Bill C-459, An Act to establish a Ukrainian Famine and Genocide Memorial Day and to recognize the Ukrainian Famine of 1932-33 as an act of genocide, at all stages through the House of Commons and Senate.

He also worked with MP Bob Rae to introduce and help pass unanimously through the House of Commons the Black Ribbon Day motion establishing an annual Canadian Day of Remembrance for the victims of Nazi and Soviet Communist regimes on August 23, called "Black Ribbon Day", to coincide with the anniversary of the signing of the infamous pact between the Nazi and Soviet Communist regimes.

Committees - House of Commons

In 2010, Wrzesnewskyj served as vice-chair on two committees: (1) Standing Committee on Citizenship and Immigration, (2) Subcommittee on Agenda and Procedure on the Standing Committee on Citizenship and Immigration.

Between 2004 and 2010, he served as member on eleven committees, including Standing Committee on Citizenship and Immigration, Standing Committee on Public Safety and National Security, Standing Committee on Public Accounts, and Standing Committee on Transport among others.

Wrzesnewskyj discussed the importance of Ukraine's accession to NATO at meetings of the Organization for Security and Co-operation in Europe parliamentary assembly meetings and official meetings of NATO member states. He was later selected as an official member of the delegation of the Speaker of the House of Commons to Ukraine (a trip geared toward developing relations between Canada and Ukraine).

He helped the previous Canadian government to negotiate and sign the historic agreement for $12.5 million with the Ukrainian Canadian community for the acknowledgement, commemoration and, education of Canadians of the dark episode of internment operations against Ukrainian Canadians.

International self-financed fact-finding missions
From 7–14 August 2009, Wrzesnewskyj initiated in a self-financed fact-finding mission to Jordan, the West Bank, and East Jerusalem along with fellow parliamentarians from the New Democratic Party and Bloc Québécois. The mission's goals were to gain firsthand knowledge and understanding and assess the opportunities to build towards a peaceful and just solution between Israel, Palestine, Lebanon, Jordan and Egypt. He subsequently co-authored a report which offered several key recommendations to the Government of Canada. He also a self-financed fact-finding mission to Darfur, Sudan, regarding the Darfur Conflict, and another to Somalia.

RCMP pension scandal
In April 2007, Wrzesnewskyj publicly called for a full judicial inquiry into the Royal Canadian Mounted Police (RCMP) pension fund scandal and spoke to the media on the matter. He was instrumental in bringing forward to the Public Accounts Committee, and pursuing, an investigation into the misuse of the RCMP pension and insurance funds involving the upper echelons of Canada's national police force which pressured the government into establishing the Task Force on Governance and Cultural Change in the RCMP. Here again, Canadian Prime Minister Paul Martin emphatically stated that "nothing would not have been done (with the RCMP pension scandal) if it hadn't been for Borys."

Hezbollah comments
In August 2006, Wrzesnewskyj said that the Canadian government should engage in talks with militant organizations, including Hezbollah, for the purpose of ending the 2006 Israel-Lebanon conflict. There were some media reports in this period that Wrzesnewskyj called for Hezbollah to be taken off Canada's list of terrorist organizations. He responded that this was a misrepresentation of his position, saying, "on the contrary, Hezbollah is a terrorist organization, and I stated that it must remain on Canada's list because it has committed war crimes by sending rockets into civilian areas." He added that Canadian law should be amended to permit political and diplomatic contact for the purposes of ending the conflict. As the result of media perceptions about his comments, he resigned his post as foreign affairs critic. He would later be critic for Crown Corporations for most of 2007.

Special Advisor to the Liberal Leader on Emerging Democracies
From 2009-11, Wrzesnewskyj held the position of Special Advisor to the Liberal Leader on Emerging Democracies.

As a Canadian parliamentarian of partial Polish heritage, Wrzesnewskyj is the founder of the Canada-Poland Parliamentary Friendship Group. He has persistently criticized Canadian Minister of Citizenship, Immigration, and Multiculturalism Jason Kenney for reducing immigration quotas from Poland, and Ukraine to Canada. He has also spoken to Canadian media on the Katyn Massacre and 2010 Polish Air Force Tu-154 crash that saw the deaths of Poland's senior government, diplomatic and military leaders, including President Lech Kaczynski.

In April 2010, with the President of the Canadian Jewish Congress Mark Freiman, Wrzesnewskyj organized a symposium featuring Meylakh Sheykhet, director of the Union of Councils for Jews of the former Soviet Union in Ukraine, on the importance of Ukrainian-Jewish relations in a historical and current geopolitical context.

Again in December 2010, Wrzesnewskyj and Mustafa Jemilev (Dzhemilev) spoke out about the potential for ethnic conflict in Crimea between Russians, Tartars, and Ukrainians.

2011 election
In the 2011 election, Wrzesnewskyj was defeated by Conservative candidate Ted Opitz by a margin of just 26 votes. A judicial recount subsequently confirmed Opitz's victory.

Nearly a year after the election, allegations of an election dirty tricks campaign linked to the Conservative Harper government persists. At a news conference on 25 February 2012, interim Liberal Leader Bob Rae said that Wrzesnewskyj will be going to court on 2 May 2012 to call for a by-election. Wrzesnewskyj will be alleging that there were irregularities at ten polls in the riding of Etobicoke Centre.

After the 2011 election
Despite the narrow loss in the May 2011 election, Wrzesnewskyj has continued dedicating himself to public service. This includes the closure of the immigration case of Arjan Tabaj, championed by Wrzesnewskyj and immigration lawyer Scott McDonald. Tabaj is a partly paralyzed survivor of an assassination attempt during elections in Albania. In September 2011, Tabaj, his wife Anilda, his daughter and twin sons returned to Canada after Jason Kenney had the family deported in 2009. Later, a Canadian federal court ruled that the family was wrongfully deported. Lorne Waldman, a leading immigration lawyer said that stark reversals like the Tabaj case "are rarer than hen's teeth".

After the arrest of Ukrainian politician Yulia Tymoshenko in August 2011, Wrzesnewskyj participated in demonstrations at the Ukrainian Consulate in Toronto, calling for the support of democracy in Ukraine and release of all political prisoners. International organizations, representatives of the European Union and the United States called Tymoshenko's arrest "selective prosecution of political opponents".

In August 2011, Wrzesnewskyj led the Ukrainian Canadian community's fundraising effort for famine relief in Somalia, i.e. 2011 Horn of Africa famine, with $100,000 committed, mostly from one donor, entrepreneur and Northland Power founder Jim Temerty, "whose family roots go back to one of the regions that was worst affected in the Holodomor".

In December 2011, Wrzesnewskyj participated in a demonstration outside the Russian consulate in Toronto. He spoke against election fraud in the 2011 Russian parliamentary elections, advocated for democracy in Russia, warned against Putinism, and called for the government of Canada to state that "Canada stands 'shoulder to shoulder' with the people of Russia, and not with Putin or the Kremlin."

Potential Liberal leadership campaign in 2013
After the Liberal Party suffered their worst defeat in history under Michael Ignatieff in the May 2, 2011 federal election, and the previous defeat of Stéphane Dion in 2008, party loyalists have objected to Liberal Party decision makers who reflexively promote and support high-profile or star leadership candidates. Supporters have quietly urged Wrzesnewskyj to run for the 2013 Liberal Party of Canada leadership election.

Supreme Court of Canada case
Wrzesnewskyj challenged the election results of May 2, 2011 in the Etobicoke Centre. Early in 2012, he launched his case in the Ontario Court of Justice, arguing voting irregularities, including ballots cast by people who did not live in the riding, the possibility that at least some people voted multiple times, and mistakes made in the conduct of the election by Elections Canada.

On May 18, Justice Thomas Lederer agreed with Wrzesnewskyj, declaring the election results null and void, and ordered a by-election in Etobicoke Centre.

Despite Justice Lederer's decision, Ted Opitz appealed to the Supreme Court of Canada and has refused to step down as MP from the House of Commons and run again against Wrzesnewskyj in a by-election. Opitz continues to vote in the House of Commons. Wrzesnewskyj has stated Opitz should sit out votes in the House of Commons: "It undermines ... our confidence in the democratic system that we have if we don't know who the actual member of Parliament is."

On 10 July 2012 the Supreme Court of Canada interrupted its summer break to hear appeals from Ted Opitz and to decide whether a by-election is required. "The Supreme Court will likely make its decision quickly since by law, it has to expedite the case. If the court rules this summer, there could be a by-election in Etobicoke Centre early in the new year, or sooner."

Instead of accepting the Ontario judge's decision and calling a by-election, the governing Conservatives decided to fight it, becoming the first party to take such a matter to the Supreme Court. Judge Lederer's May ruling was only the sixth time since 1949 that a Canadian court has set aside federal election results in a riding.

While the Tory party is paying Opitz's legal bills, the Liberal Party of Canada refused to pay for Wrzesnewskyj's legal costs. Wrzesnewskyj has spent over $300,000 of his own money to bring the case to court.

On Thursday October 25, 2012, the Supreme Court of Canada ruled in a split decision in favour of Opitz, allowing him to remain as MP for Etobicoke Center and once and for all putting an end to Wrzesnewskyj's dispute.

2015–2019
In the 2015 election, Wrzesnewskyj defeated Conservative MP Opitz by a margin of over 9,500 votes. During the election, he criticized the lack of investment in public transit by the Harper government. He also noted that Harper's time in office saw "increasing international jingoism," and criticized the Conservatives' handling of the global refugee crisis. Opitz also faced criticism for spending "more than $70,000 public dollars on self-service advertising flyers since 2011", including allegedly during an election period.

In late 2018, Wrzesnewskyj announced he would not be running for re-election in the coming 2019 election.

During the 2022 Russian invasion of Ukraine, Wrzesnewskyj helped organize Canadian volunteers going to Ukraine to serve in the International Legion of Territorial Defense of Ukraine.

Awards and recognition

Ukrainian President Viktor Yushchenko awarded Wrzesnewskyj the Order of Prince Yaroslav the Wise, one of Ukraine's highest honours, during a special May 26, 2008 ceremony on Parliament Hill, for distinguished services to the state and people of the Ukrainian nation.

In recognition of his public service in Canada–Poland relations, the Canadian Polish Congress awarded him the Gold Honorary Award on January 23, 2010. For his work with Ukrainian Canadian community, the Ukrainian Canadian Congress awarded him its highest honour, the Shevchenko Medal, on October 27, 2010.

On February 25, 2011 Wrzesnewskyj was awarded the Estonian Canadian Medal of Merit for his outstanding contribution to Canadians of Estonian heritage.

On November 15, 2014, President of Poland Bronisław Komorowski, awarded the Knight's Cross of the Order of Merit to Wrzesnewskyj, which advocated, among others, the abolition of visas to Canada for Polish citizens and donated the program of Polish language and literature at the University of Toronto.

Electoral record

Notes

References

External links

1960 births
Living people
Businesspeople from Toronto
Canadian people of Polish descent
Canadian people of Ukrainian descent
Liberal Party of Canada MPs
Members of the House of Commons of Canada from Ontario
Canadian members of the Ukrainian Greek Catholic Church
People from Etobicoke
Politicians from Toronto
Trinity College (Canada) alumni
University of Toronto alumni
Upper Canada College alumni
21st-century Canadian politicians